Viola libanotica is a species of flowering plant in the Violaceae family. It is referred to by the common name Lebanon violet and is an evergreen running herb. It is endemic to the cold heights of Lebanon.  The plant has dark green leaves. The flowers are purple.

References

libanotica
Endemic flora of Lebanon
Plants described in 1849
Taxa named by Pierre Edmond Boissier